Jangy-Aryk is a village in Osh Region of Kyrgyzstan. It is part of the Aravan District. Its population was 2,538 in 2021. It lies on the right bank of the river Aravansay, adjacent to the smaller village Kök-Jatyk.

References

Populated places in Osh Region